Tarom Sara may refer to:
 Tarom Sara, Amlash
 Tarom Sara, Rezvanshahr